Rozendaal is a town in the Dutch province of South Holland. The town is a part of the municipality Vlist. It and lies about 8 km south of Woerden.

The statistical area "Rozendaal", which also can include the surrounding countryside, has a population of around 90.

References
 

Populated places in South Holland